The 2017 season will see Eunos Crescent complete in the National Football League.  Found in 1975, the club has been around for 42 years.

In an interview in 2017, the chairman say that it hope the club will be able to compete in the S.League as a professional outfit one day.

On 31/5/2017, it was reported that Khairul Asyraf, who was previously to be the Head of Youth Development, has been named as the new head coach for the team, replacing the outgoing, Mohd Mardani.

Squad

Transfers

Pre-season

In

Out

Mid-Season

In

Out

Competitions

NFL

FA Cup

References

Singaporean football clubs 2017 season